Vărădia is a commune in Caraș-Severin County, Banat, Romania. It is composed of two villages, Mercina (Mercsény) and Vărădia.

In Vărădia village there is a Romanian Orthodox church, a Romanian Greek-Catholic church, a Baptist church, and an old Orthodox church which has become an monastery.

See also
Argidava

References

Communes in Caraș-Severin County
Localities in Romanian Banat